Audio Two was the Brooklyn, New York hip hop duo of emcee Kirk "Milk Dee" Robinson and DJ Nat "Gizmo" Robinson, most famous for its first hit "Top Billin'".

History 

The duo's debut single, "Make it Funky", was released in 1987, but it was the B-side, "Top Billin, that became the chart hit. The beat — made by Milk Dee and produced by Daddy-O of Stetsasonic — and Milk Dee's lyrics would be sampled and referenced time and time again, even by the group itself: both the group's full-length debut, 1988's What More Can I Say? and its 1990 follow-up, I Don't Care: The Album, were titled after lines from the song. However, the duo would never recapture its initial success. The singles of its second album, "I Get the Papers" and "On the Road Again," were only moderate hits. It was a time of rapid change in the hip hop market; gangsta rap was rising in popularity, and Audio Two found itself unsuccessfully struggling to maintain recording contracts and a fanbase.

Audio Two did, however, pave the way for the duo's labelmate MC Lyte, who launched her career with the hit single I Cram to Understand U (Sam). Lyte's 1998 album Seven & Seven featured a remake of "Top Billin — with the original instrumental — this time a duet between her and Milk. It has been a widely circulated rumor that both members of Audio Two were brothers of MC Lyte; however, this is untrue. In 1994, Milk released a solo EP titled Never Dated on Rick Rubin's American Recordings. While the EP was notable for its single "Spam," a duet with the Beastie Boys' Adrock with drum programming by Mike D, aside from the devoted Beastie Boys fanbase the album generated little interest. Milk eventually rediscovered success by producing the singer Eamon, who recorded the 2004 hit "Fuck It (I Don't Want You Back)."

In 2007, Milk Dee recorded a verse for a remix of "I Get Money" by 50 Cent, thanking all the music artists that sampled "Top Billin'," which earned him royalties.

In recent years, Audio Two member Gizmo became a recording engineer under the name "You Can Ask" Giz. His audio work has appeared on albums by Donell Jones, Calvin Richardson, Jaheim and Tyrese, among others.

Discography

Studio albums

Unreleased albums 
The First Dead Indian (1992)

EPs

Singles

As lead artist

References

Notes

Citations

External links 
 Who Is Milk D at BeastieMania.com
 Milk D's Never Dated review at RapReviews.com
 Milk Dee Interview at HoodHype.com
 Milk Dee interview at RiotSound.com
 MC Milk Dee at MySpace.com

African-American musical groups
American musical duos
First Priority Music artists
Hip hop duos
Hip hop groups from New York City
Musical groups established in 1985
Musical groups disestablished in 1992
Musical groups from Brooklyn
1985 establishments in New York City